Igor Kuznetsov (1929–2000) was a Soviet sprint canoer who competed in the early 1950s. He was eliminated in the heats of the K-2 1000 m event at the 1952 Summer Olympics in Helsinki.

References
Sports-reference.com profile

1929 births
Canoeists at the 1952 Summer Olympics
Olympic canoeists of the Soviet Union
Soviet male canoeists
Russian male canoeists
2000 deaths